Fernando Soledade (5 February 1879 – 6 May 1959) was a Brazilian sports shooter. He competed in three events at the 1920 Summer Olympics winning a bronze medal in the team 50 m free pistol.

References

External links
 

1879 births
1959 deaths
Brazilian male sport shooters
Olympic shooters of Brazil
Shooters at the 1920 Summer Olympics
Place of birth missing
Olympic bronze medalists for Brazil
Olympic medalists in shooting
Medalists at the 1920 Summer Olympics
19th-century Brazilian people
20th-century Brazilian people